Carlia pulla is a species of skink in the genus Carlia. It is native to Papua New Guinea.

References

Carlia
Reptiles described in 1911
Endemic fauna of Papua New Guinea
Reptiles of Papua New Guinea
Taxa named by Thomas Barbour
Skinks of New Guinea